The Babak River is a river that flows in the island of Lombok, in West Nusa Tenggara, Indonesia.

Course
It originates at Mount Timanuk in East Lombok Regency, with a source elevation of 2,575 meters. It flows in a southwesterly direction, with a parallel drainage pattern, reaching the Lombok Strait at the district of Labuapi, West Lombok Regency. The length of the river's main course is around 55 km.

Watershed
The watershed of the river covers an area of 259 km2. Due to the highly seasonal flow of the river, which overflows during monsoon season and dries up during the dry seasons, it is considered a "critical watershed". Since 2007, efforts have been made by local communities to restore forests in the river's basin, reducing the impact of erosion and flooding.

References

Rivers of Lombok